Aaj Ki Taaza Khabar is a 1973 Indian comedy film directed by Rajendra Bhatia. Its stars Kiran Kumar and Radha Saluja. This film was adapted from a Gujarati play and later remade in Marathi as Pheka Pheki (1989) and in Hindi as Golmaal Returns (2008).

Plot
Sunil Mehta is stuck in a giant ferris wheel with an attractive young woman due to a power failure. He arrives home the next day, and meets a very suspicious wife, Geeta, who knows that he has been up to no good. She refuses to believe his story about the stalled ferris wheel, and he invents a story about spending the night with a fictitious friend named Champak Bhumia. Geeta does not believe that he ever has a friend by that name, and decides to write to him to come and visit her. Sunil then convinces his friend, Amit Desai, to pretend that he is Champak, and thus convince Geeta that he was indeed telling the truth. Amit agrees to do so, and everything goes according to plan - until a real and amorous Champak Bhumia shows up - resulting in hilarious chaos.

Cast
 Radha Saluja as Geeta Mehta
 Kiran Kumar as Sunil Mehta
 I. S. Johar as Ramji
 Asrani as Champak Bhumia/Amit Desai
 Manju Bansal as Kesari Desai
 Paintal as Champak Bhumia
 Padma Khanna as Motiyah Bhumia
 Narendra Nath as Capt. Ranjeet Goel
 Arpana Choudhary as Pinky
 Helen as Woman at party
 Arvind Trivadi  
 Jayshree T.
 Mehmood
 H.L. Pardeshi
 Parvesh Sawhney
 Fatima
 Sushil Bhatnagar
 Khairati

Soundtrack
All songs were penned by Hasrat Jaipuri.

Awards and nominations

References

External links
 

1973 films
1970s Hindi-language films
1973 comedy films
Films scored by Shankar–Jaikishan
Hindi films remade in other languages
Hindi-language comedy films